Another Century Records is an alternative rock record label having offices in the United States, Germany and London. It is an imprint of Century Media Records, which was acquired in August 2015 by Sony Music Entertainment.

Origins 

Founded in late 2014 by Robert Kampf, Another Century distinguishes itself from the heavy metal focus of its parent company, Century Media, by developing new artists with the goal of becoming a premiere alternative rock label. Kampf, who started Century Media Records back in 1988, said in a statement that it's his, “undying love for rock” that led to the formation of the new label, and he hopes to, "develop and break the best bands in rock."

Artists 

The label has since signed lovelytheband, Twin XL, Little Hurt, Radkey, Irontom, The Unlikely Candidates, Pretty, The Wrecks, Awkward, The Fame Riot, The Haxans, New Years Day, Stitched Up Heart, and Gemini Syndrome.

References

External links 

German record labels